Clematodes vanduzeei, the papago creosotebush grasshopper, is a species of short-horned grasshopper in the family Acrididae. It is found in North America.

Subspecies
These two subspecies belong to the species Clematodes vanduzeei:
 Clematodes vanduzeei papago Rehn & Eades, 1961
 Clematodes vanduzeei vanduzeei Hebard, 1923

References

Acrididae
Articles created by Qbugbot
Insects described in 1923
Orthoptera of North America